West Langton is a civil parish in the Harborough district of Leicestershire, England.  The main settlement in the parish is Langton Hall (not to be confused with another Langton Hall, in Langton, North Yorkshire.)

West Langton is near Kibworth and Market Harborough, and the parish according to the 2001 census had a population of 128.

See also 
 East Langton / Church Langton

References

External links

Villages in Leicestershire
Civil parishes in Harborough District